A debutante, also spelled débutante, (from  , "female beginner") or deb is a young woman of aristocratic or upper-class family background who has reached maturity and, as a new adult, is presented to society at a formal "debut" or possibly debutante ball. Originally, the term meant that the woman was old enough to be married, and part of the purpose of her coming out was to display her to eligible bachelors and their families, with a view to marriage within a select circle.

Austria

Vienna, Austria, still maintains many of the institutions that made up the social, courtly life of the Habsburg Empire.  One of those is the most active formal ball season in the world.  From 1 January to 1 March, no fewer than 28 formal balls, with a huge variety of hosts, are held in Vienna.  Many are for specific nationalities, like the Russian Ball or the Serbian Saint Sava ball; social groups like the Hunter's Ball or Verein Grünes Kreuz ball, or trade groups like the Coffee Roasters or Doctors Ball. Some of these balls also have debutantes.  However, the two that are best known for their debutantes are the Officer's Ball and the Vienna Opera Ball.

The  is considered to be the direct successor of Vienna's Imperial Court Ball.  The modern version was founded in 1919, by the association Alt-Neustadt, an association of graduates of the Theresian Military Academy.  They have organized the ball publicly since 1926.  The Ball is held on the third Friday of January across the twenty-three salons of the Vienna Hofburg Palace and includes nine bands of different styles of music, military formations, and dancing troupes from around the world. The patron is the President of the Republic and it is hosted by the Chief of the Defense Staff.  The entrance and presentation of the 80 debutantes is the highlight of the opening event, followed by the presentation of ministers of state, then the Diplomatic Corps, and finishes with the debutantes leading the first formal Viennese waltz to the music of "The Blue Danube". The ladies are from the nobility, daughters of senior ranking military officers, or female officers in the Austrian military.  They are presented to the Minister of Defense.  The dress code is evening dress: floor-length gowns for women, and white tie and tails for men or mess dress uniform for military members. The final ceremonial is the blowing of the hunt horns and takes place at 4 o'clock in the morning.

The Vienna Opera Ball is held in the auditorium of the Vienna State Opera which is turned into a large ballroom. On the eve of the event, the rows of seats are removed from the stalls, and a new floor, level with the stage, is built. The ball does not start until around 10 pm when the Austrian president and his guests enter the imperial balcony. Their arrival is heralded by trumpets. The Austrian national anthem is played followed by the European anthem. There are performances of the state opera ballet company and classical arias sung by the opera stars. These are normally a small selection of Italian opera and famous Austrian pieces. The highlight of the opening ceremony is the introduction of 180 debutante couples. These are carefully selected young women and men who have successfully completed an application program and a strict classical dance choreography organised by the Elmayer dance school. The debutantes are led into the opera house to the sounds of Carl Michael Ziehrer's Fächerpolonaise. The dress code is evening dress: white tie and tails for men; strictly floor-length gowns for women. White opera gloves are still mandatory for female debutantes at the Vienna Opera Ball.

Australia

In Australia, debutante balls (or colloquially "deb balls") are usually organised by high schools, church groups or service clubs, such as Lions or Rotary. The girls who take part are in either Year 10, 11 or 12 at high school (i.e. aged between 15 and 18). The event is often used as a fund-raiser for local charities.

The Australian debutante wears a white or pale-coloured gown similar to a wedding dress. However, the dress does not come with a train on the skirt, and the debutante does not wear a veil. The boy wears black tie or another formal dress suit.

It is customary for the female to ask a male to the debutante ball, with males not being able to "do the deb" unless they are asked, similar to a Sadie Hawkins Dance. The debutantes and their partners must learn how to dance in ballroom style. Debutante balls are almost always held in a reception centre, school hall, the function room of a sporting or other community organisation, e.g. RSL club, or ballroom. Usually they are held late in the year and consist of dinner, dancing, and speeches.

United Kingdom

In the United Kingdom, the presentation of debutantes to the Sovereign at Court used to mark the start of the British social season. The presentation of debutantes at court was also a way for young women of marriageable age to be presented to suitable bachelors and their families, in the hopes of finding a suitable husband. Bachelors, in turn, used the court presentation as a chance to find a suitable wife.

Those who wanted to be presented at court were required to apply for permission to do so, and to be made by ladies who had been presented to the Sovereign, such as the mother of a young woman, or her mother-in-law if she was married. If the application was accepted, they would be sent a royal summons from the Lord Chamberlain to attend the Presentation on a certain day. According to Debrett's, the proceedings on that day always started at 10 am. In addition to debutantes, older women, and married women who had not previously been presented, could be presented at Court.

On the day of the court presentation, the debutante and her sponsor would be announced, the debutante would curtsy to the Sovereign, and she would leave without turning her back.

The court dress was traditionally a white evening dress, but shades of ivory and pink were acceptable. The dress featured short sleeves and the young woman also wore long white gloves, a veil attached to the hair with three white ostrich feathers, and a train, which the debutante would hold on her arm until she was ready to be presented. Debutantes would wear pearls, but many would also wear jewellery that belonged to the family.

After the debutantes were presented to the monarch, they would attend the social season. The season consisted of events such as afternoon tea parties, polo matches, races at Royal Ascot, and balls. Many debutantes would also have their own "coming-out party" or, alternatively, a party shared with a sister or other member of family.

The last debutantes were presented at Court in 1958, after which Queen Elizabeth II abolished the ceremony. Attempts were made to keep the tradition going by organising a series of parties for young women who might otherwise have been presented at Court in their first season (to which suitable young men were also invited) by Peter Townend. However, the withdrawal of royal patronage made these occasions decreasingly significant, and scarcely distinguishable from any other part of the social season. The Queen Charlotte's Ball, a contemporary revival of the traditions of presentation at court, continues under the patronage of the Duke of Somerset.

The expression "debutante", or "deb" for short, has continued to be used, especially in the press, to refer to young women of marriageable age who participate in a semi-public, upper class social scene. The expression "deb's delight" is applied to good looking, unmarried young men from similar backgrounds.

In popular culture in the United Kingdom 
Dame Ngaio Marsh's 1938 novel Death in a White Tie is set in a London season. When Detective Inspector Alleyn's mother informs him that she is going to bring out his niece, whose parents are in Suva, Alleyn replies: “Good Lord, mama…you must be demented. Do you know what this means?’” In addition to the murder mystery, the reader is treated to an entertaining view of the effect that the Season has on a variety of characters.

In the 1933 film Our Betters, based on Somerset Maugham's 1917 play by the same name, an American heiress marries an English aristocrat for love. When she discovers on her wedding day that he married her for her money, she sets out to take revenge. Her defiant actions include wearing a daring black gown to her younger sister's presentation at court.

United States

American debutante balls

The upper classes of the United States developed social traditions related to British practices. Today a cotillion or debutante ball in the United States is a formal presentation of young women, debutantes, to "polite society", typically hosted by a charity or society. Those introduced can vary from the ages of 16 to 18 (younger ages are more typical of Southern regions, while older are more commonplace in the North). In some areas, 15- and 16-year-olds are called "junior debutantes".

One of the most prestigious, most exclusive, and most expensive debutante balls in the world is the invitation-only International Debutante Ball held annually at the Waldorf Astoria Hotel in New York City, where girls from prominent world families are presented to high society. The International Debutante Ball has presented princesses, countesses, baronesses and many European royalty and aristocrats as debutantes to high society, including Princess Katarina of Yugoslavia, Vanessa von Bismarck (great-great-granddaughter of Otto von Bismarck), Princess Natalya Elisabeth Davidovna Obolensky (granddaughter of the Prince Ivan Obolensky, who was the Chairman of the International Debutante Ball and himself the grandson of John Jacob Astor IV – founder of the Waldorf Astoria Hotel), Princess Ines de Bourbon Parme, Countess Magdalena Habsburg-Lothringen (great-great-granddaughter of Empress Elisabeth "Sisi" of Austria) and Lady Henrietta Seymour (daughter of the Duke and Duchess of Somerset).

Daughters and granddaughters of billionaire businessmen, high-ranking politicians, such as United States presidents, senators and congressmen, and ambassadors have also been presented at the International Debutante Ball; for example, Tricia Nixon, Julie Nixon, Jennie Eisenhower, Ashley Walker Bush (granddaughter of President George H. W. Bush and niece of President George W. Bush), Lucinda Robb (granddaughter of President Lyndon B. Johnson), Christine Colby (daughter of CIA director William Colby), Hollister Knowlton, Charlotte and Catherine Forbes (granddaughters of Malcolm Forbes), and Christina Huffington (daughter of Arianna Huffington of The Huffington Post). Ivanka Trump (daughter of President Donald Trump) was invited but chose not to attend.

To gain admission to a debutante ball, debutantes must usually be recommended by a distinguished committee or sponsored by an established member of élite society, typically their mothers or other female relatives. Wearing white gowns and satin or kid long gloves, the debutantes stand in a receiving line, and are introduced individually to the audience. After the debutante is announced, she is walked around the stage, guided by her father who presents her. Her younger male escort joins her and escorts her to make way for the next. Each debutante brings at least one escort, sometimes two.

Many debutante balls select escorts and pair them with the debs to promote good social pairings. Cotillions may be elaborate formal affairs and involve not only "debs" but also junior debutantes, escorts and ushers, and flower girls and pages. Every debutante must perform a curtsy, also known as the St. James Bow or a full court bow to the attendees. The exception are Texas debutantes who are presented at the International Debutante Ball at New York City's Waldorf Astoria Hotel, who perform the "Texas Dip". This gesture is made as the young woman is formally presented. Débutante balls exist in nearly every major city in the United States. They occur more frequently and are larger affairs in the American South.

The Christmas Cotillion in Savannah, Georgia, first held in 1817, is the oldest debutante ball in the United States. Many cities such as Dallas and Atlanta have several balls in a season. Dallas, for example, has a ball sponsored by the traditional Idlewild organization. Some balls sponsored by modern organizations, such  as the Dallas Symphony Orchestra Presentation Ball and La Fiesta de las Seis Banderas, raise money to benefit charities.

The National Cotillion and Thanksgiving Ball of Washington, DC., hosted by Mary-Stuart Montague Price, has met every November for over 60 years with proceeds going to Children's Hospital. Debutantes can formally participate in the ball for up to three years, wearing  different colors each time to express their increasing sophistication: debutantes wear white, post-debutantes wear black, and the post-post debutantes wear red.

Another "Old South" debutante ball is the St. Cecilia Society Ball held annually in Charleston, South Carolina.  This ball is described in Alexandra Ripley's novel, Scarlett, the sequel to Margaret Mitchell's Gone With The Wind. The Society was formed in 1766 as a private subscription concert organization. Over the next fifty-four years, its annual concert series formed the most sophisticated musical phenomenon in North America. Its musical patronage ended in 1820. Today the St. Cecilia Society flourishes is one of South Carolina's oldest and most exclusive social institutions.  Today the St. Cecilia Society hosts the annual debutante ball. The society admits only those men whose fathers or brothers are members. The women must be from these families. In New Orleans, Louisiana, a debutante is usually presented at a ball during the Carnival season.

In New York City, there are still several deb balls, including the international one described above. Charity and social balls include the Infirmary (benefits the local hospital), the Society of Mayflower Descendants Ball, and the Saint Nicholas Society of the City of New York Ball (founded 1835). As an alternative to a ball, and more frequent in the North, a young woman's family might hold a "coming-out party" for her.

Unlike the formal balls, which are held only at a traditional time of the year, the individual "coming-out party" may be held at any time of the year. Some are scheduled around such occasions as the debutante's birthday, or graduation from high school or university. In theory, the only women who could be invited would be those who had already made their débuts, thus affording a sort of rank-order to the debutante season. "Old-money" families often send their preteen sons and daughters to dancing classes, called cotillion, and etiquette lessons in preparation for these parties, which launch their children into society and act as major networking events. Even less grand debutante balls typically require debs to attend a few lessons in social dance, comportment, and in executing their curtsy.

Since the early 20th century, the African-American community organized its own tradition of social organizations, some of which sponsor similar charitable events and activities. They hold their own cotillions and debutante balls for their upper classes. Successful African Americans could meet and make connections with others of their status at such events, and make social, political and economic connections for the young women and men in their families. These formal cotillion and debutante balls still thrive as among the most traditional events of the African-American upper class.

Various Ukrainian émigré organizations in the United States, such as the Ukrainian American Medical Association of North America, the Ukrainian Engineers' Society of America, Plast Ukrainian Scouting Organization, and the Ukrainian American Youth Association have hosted annual black-tie debutante balls since after the Second World War. They are used to raise funds for charities and to introduce young Ukrainian ladies between the ages of 16 and 18 to their local ethnic Ukrainian communities. Ukrainian American debutante balls take place in American cities with substantial populations of Ukrainians, such as Chicago, Detroit, Philadelphia, Newark, and Washington D.C. Beside the traditional waltz of the debutantes, one of the highlights of these balls is the Kolomyjka, which usually takes place past midnight. Every guest may spontaneously demonstrate their skills in Ukrainian dances, such as the Hopak or Arkan. Kolomyjka dances tend to last upwards of a half-hour of nonstop folk dancing. Afterward traditional black-tie ball dances are revived.

Author Ann Anderson suggests that the high school prom of public schools is the democratic version of the debutante ball. It requires no membership in the upper class nor family restrictions to girls or boys participation.

Debutante balls in U.S. television and films
Several television series focused on young people from wealthy families include episodes with debutante events. "The Debut," an episode of The O.C. (a drama about wealthy Californians), featured a representation of an American debutante ball. "Hi, Society," (season 1, episode 10), "They Shoot Humphreys, Don't They?," (season 3, episode 9), "Riding in Town Cars with Boys (season 5, episode 10), and "Monstrous Ball" (season 6, episode 5) of Gossip Girl, also from The O.C. creator Josh Schwartz, features a debutante ball in New York City. "Presenting Lorelai Gilmore", an episode of Gilmore Girls shows Rory Gilmore as a debutante. She makes her debut at a Daughters of the American Revolution (DAR) debutante ball that her grandmother helped put together. In The Critic, Jay Sherman's younger sister Margo is persuaded to attend her debutante ball. In BoJack Horseman, the titular character's mother, Beatrice, is shown attending her debutante ball as a young adult through flashbacks in the season 4 episode "Time's Arrow".

In the premiere of The City, Whitney Port's reality show, her co-worker Olivia Palermo describes her first pair of Manolo Blahnik shoes, which she wore to her "Deb" at the age of 18.

Crime dramas have investigated début-related crimes. "Zoo York," an episode of CSI: NY, featured the CSI team investigating the murder of a debutante. Medical examiner Evan Zao says that he had attended a debutante ball. "Debut", an episode of Cold Case, tells the story of a young girl who is murdered the night of her debutante ball. In an episode of Law & Order: Special Victims Unit, entitled "Streetwise", detectives investigated the rape and murder of a debutante.

Films with debutante themes include Metropolitan (1990), Whit Stillman's feature film, a comedy of manners set during the deb season in Manhattan, and What a Girl Wants (2003), in which Amanda Bynes plays an American teen whose estranged father is a British lord, and who is presented at a coming-out party. Bynes is also featured in She's The Man, in which the main character attends a debutantes preparation program and finally a ball. Something New, a romantic comedy, has a scene of upper-class African Americans at a cotillion on the West Coast. The Debut (2001), a film on contemporary Filipino-American life, explores a wide variety of cultural themes through an informal debutante event.

The 1992 film The Addams Family is centered on the reconciliation of Gomez and Fester Addams. They had a falling out as teenagers at a debutante ball. In the film Little Women (1994), a "coming-out" party is given. Aunt March talks to Marmee about when Meg will be introduced into society.

Borat Subsequent Moviefilm (2020) includes a scene at a debutante ball at Johnston–Felton–Hay House in Macon, Georgia.

Latin America

In Mexico, Dominican Republic, Panama, Puerto Rico and Paraguay, debutantes are young girls who take part in a Festival de Debutantes, or a "Quince Años", held for their fifteenth birthdays. Quinceañera parties are also held in the United States among Latino communities from these nations.

In Brazil and Mexico, such events are called Baile de Debutante (Spanish and Portuguese) or Festa de Debutante (only Portuguese), or Quince Años (Spanish) or Quinze Anos (Portuguese).

In Panama, the Debutante Ball is organized by Damas Guadalupanas. It is a charity event held at Club Union. It takes place when girls are seniors in high school (17–18 years old). This follows the Quince Años, which takes place when they are 15.

See also

 Azalea Trail Maids
 Bachelor and Spinster Ball
 Celebutante
 Coming of Age Day
 Cug Huê Hng
 Debutante dress
 International Debutante Ball
 List of debutante balls in the United States
 Philippine debut
 Social Register
 Socialite
 Southern belle
 Sweet Sixteen
 Texas dip
 Veiled Prophet Ball

References

Further reading
 Alvarez, Julia. Once upon a Quinceañera: Coming of Age in the USA (Penguin, 2007), the Hispanic version
 Butler, Nicholas Michael. Votaries of Apollo: The St. Cecilia Society and the Patronage of Concert Music in Charleston, South Carolina, 1766–1820. Columbia: University of South Carolina Press, 2007. 
 Chenier, Elise. "Class, Gender, and the Social Standard: The Montreal Junior League, 1912–1939." Canadian Historical Review 90#4 (2009): 671–710. in Canada
 Jabour, Anya. Scarlett's Sisters (Univ of North Carolina Press, 2007) on upper class Southern belles
 Lewis, Cynthia, and Susan Harbage Page. "Secret Sharing: Debutantes Coming Out in the American South." Southern Cultures 18#4 (2012): 6–25.
 Marling,  Karal Ann. Debutante: Rites and Regalia of American Debdom (2004) excerpt
 Neeland, Elizabeth C. "The Woman in White: An Analysis of Women's Meaning-making Experiences in Debut" (MA thesis. University of Georgia, 2006) online, a case study of the 2005 Blue Gray Colonel's Ball in Montgomery, Alabama, to study Southern debutante culture

External links

 The Débutante, Chapter XVIII of Emily Post's Etiquette (1922), at Bartleby.com
 The Debutante, a short story by Leonora Carrington
 The British Court Presentation
 The Economist – Débutante scene in Houston
 Debretts Social Season and Debutantes

 
Upper class
Upper class culture